Kota Raja may refer to:
Kota Raja, village in Sikur, Indonesia
Banda Aceh, the capital of the Indonesian province of Aceh
Kota Raja (federal constituency), represented in the Dewan Rakyat
Kota Raja (Perlis state constituency), formerly represented in the Perlis State Legislative Assembly (1986–95)
Kota Raja (Selangor state constituency), formerly represented in the Selangor State Legislative Assembly (1995–2004)